Archaeotherium (meaning "ancient beast") is an extinct genus of entelodont artiodactyl endemic to North America during the Eocene and Oligocene epochs (35—28 mya), existing for approximately . Archaeotherium fossils are most common in the White River Formation of the Great Plains, but it has also been found in the John Day Basin of Oregon and the Trans-Pecos area of Texas.

Taxonomy
 
Archaeotherium was named by Joseph Leidy (1850). Its type is Archaeotherium mortoni. It was synonymized subjectively with Entelodon by Leidy (1853) and synonymized subjectively with Elotherium by Leidy (1857). It was assigned to Entelodontidae by Leidy (1850), Peterson (1909), Scott (1940), Galbreath (1953), Russell (1980), Carroll (1988) and Effinger (1998).

Archaeotherium, along with all other Entelodontidae, is an artiodactyl whose exact taxonomic position has been disputed, but taxonomists agree the group lies between the Suina (pigs and peccaries), and the anthracotheres, hippopotamuses, and whales.

Description
 
Adults weighed 150–250 kg (330-530 lbs).

There is no sign of sexual dimorphism in the canine teeth; females and males may have been similar in size. Though Archaeotherium is one of the best preserved of all entelodonts, skulls of entelodonts are far more commonly preserved than full skeletons, and the large size of the head in proportion to the body makes it difficult to accurately estimate the animal's living size and weight.

In life, Archaeotherium probably somewhat resembled a cow-sized peccary with a longer face, humped shoulders, wide cheekbones, and bosses on the face similar to male warthogs, but without a pig-like nasal disk.

Paleobiology
It lived in forested and riverbank environments before the evolution of grasslands. Like all entelodonts, the genus had typical artiodactyl legs but lacked specializations for fast running; though it supported its weight on cloven hooves, the foot bones remained unfused, and the toes could spread as camelid feet do. This structure, unique to entelodonts, may have helped the living animal move on soft ground. The head was unusually large, and the high spines on the vertebrae above the shoulders supported strong neck muscles and tendons to handle the weight of the head. The brain was tiny, but had relatively large olfactory lobes, suggesting that the animal had a keen sense of smell.

Reproduction 
Archaeotherium, like all entelodonts, possessed huge jugal projections. These projections are sexually dimorphic, with the males having much larger jugals than the females. Due to dimorphism, the function of the expanded jugals was likely used more for display than diet. This same sort of dimorphism can be seen in giant forest hogs, so it can be reasonably assumed that entelodont jugals supported large preorbital glands used for chemical communication signaling the intention to mate. Males would have fought for dominance through non-lethal intraspecific biting as seen by bite marks. Their mandibular tubercles are also dimorphic, and may have offered protection during combat.

Feeding and diet
 
The largest (and type) species, A. mortoni, has been analyzed as an omnivore with specializations for biting and chewing resistant objects, such as hard fruits, stems, and bones. Like all entelodonts, the teeth and jaws resemble no living animal, though there are some similarities to peccaries, pigs, bears, predatory carnivores, rhinos, and bone-crushing scavengers. There is a full dentition. The canines, premolars, and molars were all large and heavily enameled, and show heavy wear. The jaws were enormously strong and operated largely by chopping, though they could move laterally enough for the flat molars to grind. There are no blades or notches on any teeth for slicing meat, which are seen in all living and fossil taxa of predators that can chew. Archaeotherium did not have the ability to slice its meat like most modern predators, but they would have used their strong neck musculature, using their entire head and neck to rip off chunks instead. Fossil evidence suggests that in North America they may sometimes have hunted the early camel Poebrotherium, severing the body in half and crushing and swallowing the foot-long rear section  Bite marks on the cervical vertebrae of the camels suggests they attacked by running alongside their prey, snapping at their necks. The remains of these camels have been found together, implying Archaeotherium brought its kills to caches for later consumption.

Unlike both grazers and hypercarnivores, Archaeotherium teeth frequently show uneven wear that indicates the animal favored chewing on one side of the jaw, usually the result of tooth damage from hard foods. But the teeth do not show the bone-eating "piecrust fractures" seen in the larger Daeodon (Dinohyus), which may have specialized more at eating large carcasses. Tooth wear patterns suggest the interlocking front teeth of A. mortoni were frequently used to strip leaves from plants, but do not show soil scratches from rooting in the ground. Among living animals, Archeotherium has some resemblance to peccaries, and may have been a similarly aggressive mixed feeder; it was able to take animals considerably smaller than itself, scavenge on carcasses, and exploit plant foods few other animals can process. (The largest living peccary species, Catagonus wagneri, eats mostly cacti.)

Adult Archeotherium had huge temporalis muscles, but they were normal-sized in juveniles and only developed as the animal matured. This suggests the expanded cheekbones and extreme jaw strength of the genus may have been involved in adult social behavior more than eating. It is also possible that younger animals had softer diets, or Archaeotherium had significant parental care. Like other entelodonts, the jaws had an unusually wide gape; one entelodont skull shows the animal survived a bite mark near the orbit by another of the same species. Adult entelodonts may have had aggressive jaw-gaping displays and biting fights like living hippos, which have the same adaptation; in male camels, similar wounds result when one animal gets a rival's head between its jaws and bites down with the canines. The gape may also have been used to grab and position large, hard food objects like bones or nuts between the jaws to be cracked by the rear teeth, as in pigs and peccaries.

References

Entelodonts
Eocene even-toed ungulates
Oligocene even-toed ungulates
Eocene genus first appearances
Eocene mammals of North America
Oligocene mammals of North America
Rupelian genus extinctions
White River Fauna
Fossil taxa described in 1850
Prehistoric even-toed ungulate genera